Ulvi Cemal Erkin (March 14, 1906 – September 15, 1972) was a member of the pioneer group of symphonic composers in Turkey, born in the period 1904–1910, who later came to be called The Turkish Five. These composers set out the direction of music in the newly established Turkish Republic. These composers distinguished themselves with their use of Turkish folk music and modal elements in an entirely Western symphonic style.

Biography
Ulvi Cemal Erkin's aptitude for music was noticed at an early age by his mother, herself a pianist. His father was a senior civil servant in the Ottoman administration, contracted sepsis and died when the Erkin was seven. The widowed mother and her three sons took refuge at the mansion of the maternal grandfather also a high-ranking official of the declining Ottoman Empire and an intellectual.

Erkin took his first piano lessons from Mercenier, a Frenchman, and later from Adinolfi; then, a renowned professor of music in Istanbul. He graduated from Galatasaray High School. Concurrent with his studies at the Galatasaray High School dispensing education in the French language, he pursued his efforts in the path of becoming a musician and availed himself of every opportunity which could contribute to his aspirations.

The newly founded republic was aiming to expand modernisation and westernisation to every aspect of life, including music. Atatürk had long pondered a renovation also in this domain and was very keen on seeing it in progress. To this end, scholarships were being given to gifted young students in European academic institutions. Ulvi Cemal Erkin was 19 years old when he won the contest of the Ministry of Education and was awarded a scholarship to study music in Paris, together with two other students, Cezmi Rifki Erinc and Ekrem Zeki Un in 1925. He studied in the Paris Conservatory and the Ecole Normale de Musique. He studied piano with Isidor Philipp, and composition with Jean and Noël Gallon and Nadia Boulanger at the Paris Conservatoire and the École Normale de Musique.

Upon his return to Turkey in 1930, he began teaching at the Musiki Muallim Mektebi (School of Musical Education). He met his wife Ferhunde Erkin (née  Remzi) there. On September 29, 1932, he married her, herself a pianist, graduate of the Leipzig Conservatory, and his colleague at the school in Ankara. She became his muse and best interpreter and they shared a lifetime of dedicated endeavours to encourage and train young musicians with the scanty means afforded to institutions and to build up audiences of polyphonic music throughout Anatolia.

Erkin shared the grand prize of the Republican People's Party with Ahmet Adnan Saygun and Hasan Ferit Alnar in 1943 for his Piano Concerto. He wrote the famous Köçekçe orchestral suite the same year. It was Alfred Cortot who gave him the idea of composing a piano concerto during his visit to Turkey, after listening to his Quartet.

The Piano Concerto and the Köçekçe suite were premiered by the Presidential Symphony Orchestra on March 11, 1943. The orchestra was conducted by Dr. Ernst Praetorius, and Ferhunde Erkin was the soloist. On the request of German Ambassador Franz von Papen, the piano concerto was performed in Berlin, Germany on October 8, 1943. The Berlin Philharmonic was conducted by Fritz Zaun and the soloist was again Ferhunde Erkin.

Erkin, who composed his first works while a student in Paris, was productive as a composer throughout his career as a professor of music which he embarked in 1930 at the age of 24, or occasion appearing as a pianist to perform a concerto, on others as an accompanist or as an orchestra conductor to interpret his own works or operas. He also conducted the Conservatoire Student Orchestra at its periodic concerts and composed the "Sinfonietta", a work composed expressly to help instrumentalists overcome certain rhythmic and modal difficulties, peculiar to Turkish music.

With its genuine quality, warmth and apparent simplicity, Erkin's music was very influential in arousing the enthusiasm of the Turkish public towards polyphonic music, and his works were among those most frequently performed. This is still the case today. The spiritual power of modal traditional music is masterfully reflected in spite of the absence of quarter tones in Western orchestral instruments and the uneven rhythmic beats of folk music are exquisitely employed in enchanting harmonic structure and orchestration.

His works are widely and frequently performed and broadcast outside Turkey and he personally conducted his own works with orchestras such as the Czech Philharmonic, Concerts Colonne at the Brussels Fair and Orchestre philharmonique de Radio France.

Erkin's heart had been failing since his late forties and he succumbed to a last stroke on September 15, 1972 at the age of 65. He was laid to rest at the Karşıyaka Cemetery in Ankara.

Honours
Erkin was awarded the Palm Académique, Légion d'honneur chivalrous and official degrees, and the Italian Republic Medal. He was conferred the title of State Artist by the Turkish government in 1971. Erkin was awarded a post-mortem medal of honour by the Sevda-Cenap And Music Foundation in 1991. A postage stamp commemorating his life was issued by the Turkish postal system in 1985.

In July 2010, The Municipality of Çankaya (Ankara) organised a national architectural competition for a concert hall with 2000 seats which shall be named after his name; Ulvi Cemal Erkin Concert Hall. The competition won by architects Ramazan Avcı, Seden Cinasal Avcı and Evren Başbuğ; a design team formed by the partners of SCRA Architects and Dist Architects. The site for the concert hall is in Çankaya, the central metropolitan district of the city of Ankara, the capital of Turkey.

Works 
 Two Dances, for orchestra, 1930. Premiered in 1931 by the Presidential Music Ensemble, Ankara.
 Concertino, for piano and orchestra, 1932. First rendition on two pianos, by Ferhunde Erkin and the composer. Premiered in 1934 by Presidential Philharmonic Orchestra, conducted by the composer.
 Five Drops, for solo piano. Animato, Lento, Tranquillo, Energico, Moderato. First played by the composer himself, 7 November 1931, Sivas Military Social Center.
 "Full Moon" and "Nightingale", for soprano and small orchestra, 1932.
 "Lullaby, Improvisation and Zeybek Air", for violin and piano, 1929–1932.
 Bayram, for orchestra, 1934. Premiered by Presidential Philharmonic Orchestra under the baton of the conductor, 1934.
 String Quartet, 1935–1936. Movements: Allegro ma non troppo, Allegro scherzando, Andante, Allegro quasi improvisatione. Premiered 22–23 April 1938.
 "Sensations", 11 piano pieces, 1937. Titles: The Game (Allegro Vivo), 2. The Little Shepherd (Andante), 3. The Brook (Allegro Vivo), 4. The Ox-Cart (Largo), 5. The Game (Allegro Vivo), 6. Marching Song (Tempo di Marcia), 7. The Joke (Vivace), Flights (Agitato), 9. The Game (Allegro), 10. Don't Weep Beloved (Lento), 11. Zeybek Air (Allegro Moderato). First performance by Ferhunde Erkin, April 17, 1947.
 Six Folk Songs, for voice and piano. "The Reunion", "Oh Hanife", "Mastic dribbles along the pine trunk", "Full moon", "Ferment", "Turkmeni", for voice and piano, 1936. (First composed for voice and piano, these works were later developed by the composer for orchestral accompaniment.)
 Twelve Folk Songs arranged in two parts, 1936. "Oh, do not weep", "Istanbul is such a fine red coral land", "Zühre: In deep seas twine", "I roam from land to land", "Efe Song -Yörük Ali: Of all the cool and clear brooks", "Sille square", "Katurjolu zeybek", "A zeybek blond and burly", "I was born in Bergama (Bergama 1)", "Let me reach this cloudy mountain peak", "I was born in Bergama (Bergama 2)", "In green meadows". Composed upon the suggestion of Paul Hindemith
 Seven Folk Songs, for voice and orchestra. "The Reunion", "Oh, Hanife", "Mastic dribbles along the pine trunk", "Full moon", "Ferment", "Turkmeni", "The Nightingale", 1939. Originally arranged for piano accompaniment, these folk songs were later developed by the composer into an orchestral series. "The Nightingale" was introduced in this series in its 1939 version.
 Piano Concerto, 1942. Movements: Allegro, Andante, Scherzo, Andante – Allegro. The first performance was by the Presidential Philharmonic Orchestra, Conductor: Dr. Ernst Praetorius, Piano: Ferhunde Erkin, Ankara Radio, March 11, 1943. The concerto was performed abroad Berlin by the Stadtischen Orchesters Berlin, Conductor: Fritz Zaun, Piano: Ferhunde Erkin, on October 18, 1943. Publication: Universal Edition, Vienna, 1951. Dedicated to Ferhunde Erkin.
 Köçekçe, dance rhapsody for orchestra, 1943. Premièred by the presidential Philharmonic Orchestra, Conductor: Ernst Praetorius, Ankara Radio, February 1, 1943. The work was dedicated to Vedat Nedim Tör, with the inscription: "To Dr. Vedat Nedim Tör, whose interest in art has made a great contribution to the composition of these pages (October 28, 1942)."
 Six Folk Songs for mixed chorus, "Myrtle grows on their front yard", "Ferai", "Whose beloved are you", "Water awakens the trench", "Song of the partridge", "Superb is your daughter ma’am", 1945. First performance was under the direction of Mesut Cemil Tel in Ankara Radio.
 Quintet with Piano, for piano, two violins, viola and cello, 1946. Movements: Moderato, Adagio mesto, Ritmico Energico, Allegro vivo. The first performance was by Ferhunde Erkin (piano), Gilbert Back (violin), Sedat Ediz (violin), İzzet Nezih Albayrak (alto), Mesut Cemil Tel (cello), Ankara Radio, January 23, 1946.
 Sonata, for piano. 1946. Movements: Allegro, Adagio molto sostenuto, Allegro. First performance by Ferhunde Erkin, January 15, 1948. Publication: Ankara State Conservatoire Publications, No: 11, 1958.
 Symphony No. 1, for orchestra April 20, 1946. Movements: Allegro aperto, Adagio, Allegro scherzando, Moderato-Allegro non troppo. The work was premièred by the Presidential Philharmonic Orchestra, Conductor: Ulvi Cemal Erkin, Auditorium of the Ankara State Conservatoire, April 20, 1946.
 Violin concerto. 1946–1947. Movements: Allegro giusto, Adagio, Allegro con fuoco. Premièred in the inauguration ceremony of the Ankara Opera House (State Opera and Theatre Building ). Presidential Philharmonic Orchestra, Conductor: Ulvi Cemal Erkin, Violin: Lico Amar. Ankara, April 2, 1948. Publication: State Conservatoire Publications, 1968.
 Symphony No. 2. 1948–1951 (draft), 1958 (completion of the orchestration). Première: Munich Philharmonic Orchestra, Conductor: Karl Oehring, Germany, July 2, 1958.
 Keloğlan ballet music. June 2, 1958. Choreography by Ninette de Valois.
 Karagöz, Music for a play for children, Music composed for the play "Karagöz in Ankara", written by İsmail Hakkı Baltacıoğlu for the Children's Theatre of the Society for the Protection of Children.
 Sinfonietta, for string orchestra, 1951–1959. Movements: Allegro, Adagio, Allegro. First performance by the Presidential Symphony Orchestra, Conductor: Prof. Gotthold Ephraim Lessing, Ankara Radio, 1967; first public performance: Presidential Symphony Orchestra, conductor: Prof. Lessing, February 17, 1967. Dedicated to Nazım Kamil Bayur.
 Ten folk songs arranged for mixed chorus, 1. Madımak: Knotgrass (Sivas, halay dance for women), 2. Nutter girl (Erzurum folk dance), 3. Dirvana: Dove in laz language (Trabzon folk song), 4.The ice cream vendor, 5. Salına salına: Your swaying gait, 6. Advice, 7. The rose has my soul, 8. Herald, I'm undone, 9. Misty mountains (Erzincan folk song), 10. Fair-haired bride. 1963. The first performance was by the chorus of the Ankara State Opera at a concert organized within the framework of Yapı & Kredi Bank's cultural programme for 20. Anniversary celebrations. 28 choral arrangements by various composers were performed within this programme. Erkin was represented with "Fair-haired bride", "Madımak" and the "Ice cream vendor". These works were commissioned to Turkish composers by the Yapı & Kredi Bank.
 Six preludes for piano. 1965–1967. Premiered by Gülay Uğurata in Ankara Radio, November 20, 1969. 1. Lento misterioso, 2. Allegro, 3.Larghetto, 4. Allegro moderato, 5. Allegro, 6. Allegro vivo. (Subsequent to the publication of the score, Erkin revised the order as: 1–5–3–2–4–6.) Publication: Ankara State Conservatoire Publications, No: 43, 1968.
 Symphony Concertante, for piano and orchestra, November 1965 – August 7, 1966. Movements: Andante con moto, Adagio, Allegro Moderato. The first performance is by the Presidential Symphony Orchestra, Conductor: Gotthold Ephraim Lessing, Piano: Verda Erman. The concert took place within the framework of the Contemporary Turkish Music Week, November 10, 1967. The work was commissioned by Turkish Radio and Television (TRT). Publication: State Conservatoire Publications, 1967.
 Symphonic movement (for large orchestra). 1968–1969 (Completion: August 18, 1969, Dragos – İstanbul) The work was first performed by the Presidential Symphony Orchestra, Conductor: Jean Périsson, Ankara, October 8, 1976. This work was commissioned by Turkish Radio and Television (TRT) in 1967.

See also
The Turkish Five
Feridun Cemal Erkin

References
Notes

Further Reading
 Aydin, Yilmaz (2002). Die Werke der 'Türkischen Fünf' im Lichte der Musikalischen Wechselbeziehungen zwischen der Türkei und Europa. Europäische Hochshculschriften, Peter Lang Publisher.

External links
 Ulvi Cemal Erkin, Official Web Site

1906 births
1972 deaths
Galatasaray High School alumni
The Turkish Five
École Normale de Musique de Paris alumni
Turkish classical composers
Burials at Karşıyaka Cemetery, Ankara
20th-century classical composers
Male classical composers
Chevaliers of the Légion d'honneur
20th-century male musicians
Academic staff of Ankara State Conservatory

ja:ジェマル・レシット・レイ